The list of banks in Mongolia includes:

Central bank 
 Bank of Mongolia (Mongolbank)

State-owned banks

Commercial banks

References 

Financial Sector Structure and authorities responsible for financial stability

Mongolia
Banks
Mongolia